The 1951 Drake Bulldogs football team was an American football team that represented Drake University as a member of the Missouri Valley Conference during the 1951 college football season. In its third season under head coach Warren Gaer, the team compiled a 7–2 record (3–1 against MVC opponents), tied for fourth place in the conference, and outscored opponents by a total of 247 to 117. The team played its home games at Drake Stadium in Des Moines, Iowa.

On October 20, 1951, Drake halfback Johnny Bright, an African-American athlete and Heisman Trophy candidate, was assaulted by a white player during a game against Oklahoma A&M.  The assault resulted in a broken jaw to Bright.  When the Missouri Valley Conference refused to discipline Oklahoma A&M, despite evidence of a concerted and racially-motivated plan to injure Bright, Drake withdrew from the conference in protest. In 2005, Oklahoma State's president issued a letter of apology for the incident which has become known at the Johnny Bright incident.

Bright had led the nation in total offense in both 1949 and 1950. See List of NCAA major college football yearly total offense leaders. At the end of the 1951 season, he was selected by the United Press, based on voting from 260 sports writers and broadcasters, as a second-team player on the 1951 College Football All-America Team. Bright later played 11 seasons in the Canadian Football League and was inducted into both the College Football Hall of Fame and the Canadian Football Hall of Fame.

Schedule

References

Drake
Drake Bulldogs football seasons
Drake Bulldogs football